Holger may refer to:

People
 Holger (given name), includes name origin, plus people with the name
 Hilde Holger, stage name of dancer, choreographer and dance teacher Hilde Boman-Behram (née Hilde Sofer, 1905–2001)

Fictional characters
 Holger Danske, a legendary Danish hero

Other uses
 Holger Danske (Resistance group)
 Holger Danske (opera)
 9266 Holger, a main-belt asteroid
 Radio Holger